Diar Jan (also Romanized as Dīār Jān) is a village in Deylaman Rural District, Deylaman District, Siahkal County, Gilan Province, Iran. At the 2006 census, its population was 138, in 44 families.

References 

Populated places in Siahkal County